Leonardo Bonifazio (born 20 March 1991 in Cuneo) is an Italian cyclist, who currently rides for UCI ProTeam . His younger brother Niccolò Bonifazio is also a professional cyclist, also with the  team.

Major results
2016
 2nd Trofeo Edil C
 9th Circuito del Porto
2017
 3rd La Popolarissima
 4th Circuito del Porto
2018
 4th GP de Fourmies
 5th Circuito del Porto
 8th Overall Tour du Loir-et-Cher
1st Stage 1

References

External links

1991 births
Living people
Italian male cyclists
People from Cuneo
Cyclists from Piedmont
Sportspeople from the Province of Cuneo